Anri Sala (born 1974) is an Albanian contemporary artist whose primary medium is video.

Life and career

Sala studied art at the Albanian Academy of Arts from 1992 to 1996. He also studied video at the Ecole Nationale des Arts Décoratifs, Paris and film direction in Le Fresnoy-Studio National des Arts Contemporains, Tourcoing. He lives and works in Paris.

Sala's video installation Dammi i colori ("Give me the colors") was on display at Tate Modern in London. The installation reflects on the transformation of Tirana in 2003 by means of colors. The installation includes a conversation with Tirana's mayor, Edi Rama, a personal friend of the artist's and the force behind this transformation. Sala will participate in ROUNDTABLE: The 9th Gwangju Biennale (2012).

Answer Me (2008) was filmed in a Buckminster Fuller-inspired geodesic dome in Berlin, a former NSA surveillance tower, which was constructed on the Teufelsberg (Devil's Mountain).

He represented France at the Venice Biennale in 2013.

Sala presented Le Clash (2010), Tlatelolco Clash (2011) and Doldrum (2014) as a mixed installation in Gemeentemuseum Den Haag, and in November 2014 he won the Vincent Award.

He is in a relationship with Rosario, Princess of Preslav.

Exhibitions

Solo exhibitions 

2016

 Anri Sala: Answer Me, New Museum, New York

2013

 Ravel-Ravel-unRavel, French Pavilion, Biennale di Venezia

2011

 No Formula One No Cry, The Promenade Gallery, Vlora
 Anri Sala, Serpentine Galleries, London

2005

 Dammi i Colori, DAAD-Galerie, Berlin
 Videos, Museum Boijmans van Beuningen, Rotterdam
 Long Sorrow, Nicola Trussardi Foundation, Milan

2004

 Alfonso Artiaco, Neapel
 Anri Sala - Wo sich Fuchs und Hase gute Nacht sagen, Deichtorhallen, Hamburg

2003

 Blindfold, Galerie Johnen and Schöttle, Köln
 Kunsthalle Wien, Wien
 Castello di Rivoli Museo d’Arte Contemporanea, Turin, Italien

2002

 Programa, Mexico City
 OPA (artist-run space), Guadalajara, Mexico

2000

 De Appel Foundation, Amsterdam
 Galerie Johnen and Schöttle, Cologne (with Martin Boyce)
 Galerie Rüdiger Schöttle, Munich (with Torsten Slama)

2001

 Galerie Chantal Croussel, Paris

2002

 Hauser & Wirth, Zürich

Group exhibitions 

2009

 "Closer", Beirut Art Center

2005

 Situated Self, Museum of Contemporary Art, Belgrade

2004

 Delay, Museum Boijmans van Beuningen, Rotterdam
 Situations construites, attitudes espace d'arts contemporains, Geneva
 utopia station: auf dem weg nach porto alegre, Haus der Kunst, Munich
 Time Zones: Recent Film and Video, Tate Modern, London
 Point of View - An Anthology of the Moving Image, UCLA Hammer Museum, Los Angeles
 Point of View: An Anthology of the Moving Image, New Museum of Contemporary Art, New York
 Terminal 5  In 2004, the dormant Saarinen-designed TWA Flight Center (now Jetblue Terminal 5) at JFK Airport briefly hosted an art exhibition called Terminal 5 curated by Rachel K. Ward and featuring the work of 18 artists including Anri Sala. The show featured work, lectures and temporary installations drawing inspiration from the idea of travel — and the terminal's architecture. The show was to run from October 1, 2004 to January 31, 2005 — though it closed abruptly after the building itself was vandalized during the opening party.

2003

 Fast Forward, ZKM | Museum für Neue Kunst, Karlsruhe
 In den Schluchten des Balkan - Eine Reportage, Kunsthalle Fridericianum, Cassel
 Dreams and Conflicts: the Dictatorship of the Viewer, Venice Biennale
 Die Erfindung der Vergangenheit, Pinakothek der Moderne, Munich
 Hardcore - vers un nouvel activisme/towards a new activism, Palais de Tokyo, Paris
 Witness, The Curve, Barbican Centre, London

2002

 el aire es azul – the air is blue, Casa Museo Luis Barragán
 Missing Landscape, Galerie Johnen and Schöttle, Cologne
 In Search of Balcania, Graz
 The mind is a horse, Bloomberg Space, London
 Geschichte(n), Salzburger Kunstverein
 Haunted by Details, DeAppel, Amsterdam
 Cardinales, Museo de Arte Contemporanea de Vigo, Vigo

2001

 Berlin Biennale
 Yokohama Biennale, Japan
 Believe, Westfälischer Kunstverein Münster
 Tirana Biennale, Albania

2000

 Media City Seoul 2000, Seoul Metropolitan Museum, Seoul
 Geographies: Darren Almond – Graham Gussin – Anri Sala, Galerie Chantal Croussel, Paris
 voilà- le monde dans la tête, Musée d’art moderne de la ville de Paris
 Manifesta 3, Ljubljana, Slovenia
 The world in mind, ARC, Musée d’Art Moderne de la Ville de Paris
 Wie Weg - Disappeared, Association for Contemporary Art, Graz
 Wider Bild Gegen Wart- Positions to a political discours, Raum Aktueller Kunst, Vienna
 Man muss ganz schön viel lernen, um hier zu funktionieren, Frankfurter Kunstverein

1999

 After the wall, Moderna Museet, Stockholm
 Albanischer Pavillon, 47. Venice Biennale

1997

 Ostrenanije-97, Video Festival, Bauhaus, Dessau

1995

 Tunnel 95, National Gallery, Tirana
 Spring 95, First Prize, National Gallery, Tirana
 Symposium Kultur Kontakt, Kunsthaus Horn, Austria

Short films

1999

 Quelle histoire? (Mirage Illimité), Paris
 Nocturnes (Le Fresnoy), Tourcoing. Selected at the Rencontres cinématographiques, Tourcoing (1999); selected at the Short Film Festival, Clermont Ferrand (2000)

1998

 Intervista - finding the words (Ideale Audience, ENSAD), Paris. Best Film Award, Estavar Video Festival, Estavar. Best Documentary Film Award, Entrevues Festival, Belfort. Best Short Film Award, Amascultura Festival, Portugal. Best Documentary Film Award, International Documentary Film Festival, Santiago de Compostela, Spain (1999). Best Documentary Film Award, Filmfest 2000, Tirana

Recognition and awards
 Vincent Award (2014)
 Absolut Art Award (2011)
 Young Artist Prize at the 49th Venice Biennale (2001)
 Prix Gilles Dusein, Paris (2000)
 Best Documentary Film Award from the Filmfest in Tirana (2000)
 International Film Festival in Santiago de Compostela (1999).
 Hugo Boss Prize (2002)

Essential bibliography
 Mark Godfrey, "1000 words: Anri Sala", Artforum, New York, April (2015)
 Christine Macel, "Anri Sala - Ravel Ravel Unravel", Venice Biennale (2013)
 Christopher Mooney, "Anri Sala", Art Review, London, Summer (2013)
 Michael Fried, Joshua Simon, "Anri Sala", Serpentine Gallery, London (2011)
 Hans Ulrich Obrist, Mark Godfrey, Liam Gillick, "Anri Sala", Phaidon, London (2006)
 Lynne Cooke, Mark Godfrey, Jan Verwoert, "Anri Sala", Parkett, Zurich (2005)
 Massimiliano Gioni, Michele Robecchi, "Anri Sala: Unfinished Histories", Flash Art, Milan, no. 219, July–September (2001)
 Laurence Bosse, Hans Ulrich Obrist, "Anri Sala: When the Night Calls", Musée d'Art Moderne de la Ville de Paris (1999)

See also
 Albanian art
 Modern Albanian art

References

External links
An Award Winning Clash (11/2015)
No Formula One No Cry at The Promenade Gallery: Anri Sala
Hauser & Wirth: Anri Sala
frieze review (04/2008)
Artforum review (06/2004)
Article
Anri Sala in the Video Data Bank
ICP: Anri Sala (01/2008)
Anri Sala: A Spurious Emission / MOCA Museum of Contemporary Art, North Miami Video at VernissageTV.
ANRI SALA on re-title.com
Anri Sala at Fondazione Nicola Trussardi
Anri Sala at Johnen Galerie, Berlin
Anri Sala at culturebase.net
Brooklyn Rail article (11/2011)
Music before language. An interview with Anri Sala Video by Louisiana Channel
Anri Sala exhibition at the Serpentine Galleries 2011

1974 births
Living people
Artists from Tirana
Video artists
University of Arts (Albania) alumni